Anis Kachohi (born 1977 in Pontoise, Val-d'Oise) is a French singer. He is also known as Anis.

Career
In the spring of 2005, Anis released his first album Gadjo décalé with the studio "Gang" in Paris. The album contained autobiographical and sober lyrics. The music is a mix of his soul, reggae, and blues influences.

The television station France 2 picked him as the Singer of the Summer in 2007; the channel showed regularly videos of "Cergy", "Intégration", and "Avec le Vent". In 2005 he followed up with the album La Chance on Virgin/EMI.

Discography 
2003: Gadjo décalé (Tchad House)
2005: La Chance (Virgin/EMI)
2008: Rodéo Boulevard

References

External links 
Official Site

1977 births
Living people
People from Pontoise
21st-century French singers
21st-century French male singers